Karen Movsziszian (born January 6, 1963) is an Armenian chess Grandmaster (1994). He played for Germany from 1993 to 1997 and lives in Spain. He won the Armenian Chess Championship in 1981, the European Senior Chess Championship (50+) in 2017 and the World Senior Chess Championship (50+) in 2018.

Achievements

2007: Third at La Pobla de Lillet Open
2011: First at Sant Boi de Llobregat Open
2014: First at Vallfogona de Balaguer Open
2015: First at Vallfogona de Balaguer Open
2016: First at Sitges Open
2016: First at La Pobla de Lillet Open

References

External links

Karen Movsziszian chess games - 365Chess.com

1963 births
Living people
Sportspeople from Yerevan
Chess grandmasters
Armenian chess players